Es Fangar is an ecologically managed agricultural endeavour. It is the largest estate in the municipality of Manacor and a wide selection of certified organic, vegan as vegetarian wines are being produced on the premise. A large section of the estate is listed as an ANEI (natural protection area).

Location 
Es Fangar, the largest estate in the area of the cities of Manacor and Felanitx, is located in the southeast of Mallorca. It is the largest organically managed finca in the Balearic Islands and measures a total of 1000 hectares with its own nature reserve of approximately 400 hectares. 

The premise is framed by a mountain landscape, thus its own microclimate.The nature reserve is a retreat for many endangered plant and animal species. Countless bird species, turtles, wild goats and rare species of insects such as wild bees, butterflies, praying mantises, bumblebees, dragonflies and more find a protected habitat here. In addition, Es Fangar has the largest pine forest in the southeast of Mallorca and combines an impressive mountain and rock landscapes with high plateaus and vast valleys.

History 
Es Fangar looks back on an eventful history. As the only coherent historical property, the megafinca has survived history almost unharmed. The property was owned by the Truyol family and Marqués de la Torre de Fangar for many decades and originally covered an area of over 3,500 hectares. His wife Marquésa de la Torre Villalonga de Fangar was actively involved in the fate of Es Fangar, which was more than extraordinary in Mallorca at that time. In the early 20th century, the property was acquired by the Armstrong family in Bonnin, and at the turn of the millennium, all property was owned by a Swiss entrepreneurial family. The renaturation and renovation of the finca is being continued by the new owners since the takeover at the turn of the millennium. Meanwhile, the historically valuable Possession provides jobs for more than 95 employees. Due to the few changes of ownership, the enormous financial commitment and visions of the new owners, the entire finca could be preserved as an organic farm with many original features and be aligned in a modern, economically successful future.

Management 
The management is strictly biological. The individual departments complement each other as a holistic concept and in regards to the wines the finca follows the terroir approach. The soil remains closed over a large area, which guarantees the highest possible minerality in the vines and the best health of the plant roots. 
Soil ventilation happens naturally with the planting of taproots and legumes. Biodiversity is ensured by natural colonization of soil insects. In addition to pollinating of the entire plant life at Es Fangar, honey bees also serve to care for the grapevines. They pick up the nectar for the wine by consuming the nectar of torn grapes. Plants enjoy the same status as animals. Their habitat is also respected with the utmost care by being done by hand for a great part and the use of machines is renounced as far as possible. Due to its embedded location in the surrounding hilly landscape, Es Fangar has an exceptional microclimate, which, among other positive effects, gives Es Fangar wines a unique selling proposition.

Philosophy 
Es Fangar sees itself as a generational project with the goal of managing the entire finca ecologically sustainable. The owners are visionaries and advocates of modern, global and sustainable corporate governance. Natives, soil-acquainted and agricultural employees bring their knowledge in viniculture, agriculture and olives. An internationally positioned team looks after the stud training, taking the globally proven German FN training guideline into account.

Manacor
Buildings and structures in Mallorca